The 2010–11 Bloomington PrairieThunder season was the first season in the Central Hockey League of the CHL franchise in Bloomington, Illinois.

Off-season
On August 10, 2010, it was announced that head coach Jarrod Skalde resigned to pursue other coaching opportunities. On August 25, 2010 they announced that Jason Christie would be the new head coach.

Regular season

Conference standings

Awards and records

Awards

Milestones

Transactions
The PrairieThunder have been involved in the following transactions during the 2010–11 season.

Trades

Player signings

Players re-signed

Lost via waivers

Roster

Updated February 9, 2011.

|}

See also
 2010–11 CHL season

References

External links
 2010–11 Bloomington PrairieThunder season at Pointstreak

B
B